The following are the national records in speed skating in Australia maintained by the Australian Ice Racing Inc.

Men

Women

References

External links
 Australian Ice Racing

National records in speed skating
Speed skating-related lists
Speed skating
Records
Speed skating